The Colorado Mammoth are a lacrosse team based in Denver, Colorado playing in the National Lacrosse League (NLL). The 2011 season was the 25th in franchise history and 9th as the Mammoth (previously the Washington Power, Pittsburgh Crossefire, and Baltimore Thunder).

The Mammoth lost their first 5 games at home, continuing their home futility streak to 13 games before defeating the Boston Blazers in overtime. They subsequently won their next two home games, and finished the season 5-11 and in 4th place in the West. The Mammoth lost 10-6 to the Calgary Roughnecks in the Division Semifinal.

Regular season

Conference standings

Game log
Reference:

Playoffs

Game log
Reference:

Roster

See also
2011 NLL season

References

Colorado
Colorado Mammoth seasons
2011 in sports in Colorado